was a Japanese visual kei gothic metal band formed in 2002 by Kaworu, Daiki, Uri, Amare, and Death. Guitarist Death soon left and was replaced by Teru. Amare left the group after their first single and was replaced by Takamasa, whom left himself in 2005. Shagrath took his place, but the band suffered a car accident in 2006 which left most of its members seriously injured. Though most of them recovered, drummer Uri was never able to play decently again. Since the band did not have the intention of carrying on without him, they announced their end in 2007.

Members 
Last line-up
  – vocals (2002–2007)
  – bass (2002–2007)
 Uri – drums (2002–2007)
 Teru – guitar (2002–2007)
 Shagrath – guitar (2005–2007)

Former members
 Death – guitar (2002)
 Amare – guitar (2002–2003)
 Takamasa – guitar (2003–2005)

Discography 
Albums & EPs
 
 

Singles
 
 
 "Indigo Blue Story" (March 13, 2005)
 
 

Videos
 
 Happy End (July 15, 2007)
 

Omnibuses
 Punishment Party Vol.3 (March 2002, with "Moumokuna Kikeiji no Kaisenkyoku")
 Punishment Party Vol.4 (July 25, 2002, with "Mind... F")
 New Scream Date 2002 (September 29, 2002, with "Ru Zeru to Shizuki")
 "Water & Oil" (May 22, 2004, split single with Mizeria, with "Nabanax" and "Raamen")
 Crow That Wore Crown (October 29, 2008, with "Kyuuketsu ~Uruwashiki Nanji no Chi~")

References 

Visual kei musical groups
Musical quintets
Musical groups established in 2002
Musical groups disestablished in 2007
Japanese gothic metal musical groups